Huntly College is a state-owned school located in the Waikato, New Zealand town of Huntly.

The wide variety of programmes available recognises the differing abilities and needs of those attending the school, and ensures that all students have the chance to succeed at their own level and in their chosen field.

Huntly College is a small school, with a current roll of approximately 350 students. The roll peaked in the early 1980s with student numbers at that time in excess of 800. This number was associated with the development of the Huntly Power Station and the operation of several state-owned coal mines. By 1991 the roll had dropped to around 500 students, and has continued to decline. The small nature of the current roll allows the school to offer small class sizes. The ages range from Year 9 - Year 13.

The area is home to its original inhabitants, the Tainui people, to whom the Waikato River and Taupiri Mountain are sacred. Huntly College roll is 72% Maori. Students participate in camps, trips, extra curricular activities (drama, dance, kapa haka) and a range of sports. Huntly College is close to two major New Zealand cities, Hamilton 35 km to the south and Auckland, New Zealand's largest city (population of over one million), is approximately 90 km north. The college is also less than one hour's drive to either the west or east coasts.

The school's motto, "ma te pono ka watea", is a Maori translation of "the truth shall set you free". Alumni have included rugby league player Martin Moana and the Topp Twins.

The current principal Barbara Cavanagh became principal in 2018.

References

Secondary schools in Waikato
Huntly, New Zealand